"Save the Clam" is the 19th episode of the eleventh season and the 207th overall episode of the animated comedy series Family Guy. It aired on Fox in the United States on May 5, 2013, and is written by Chris Sheridan and directed by Brian Iles. The episode's plot revolves around Peter and his friends trying to save Quahog’s local bar, The Drunken Clam, from being closed down after the owner Horace is killed in a freak accident during a ball game.

Plot
During a Drunken Clam softball game against Mort's team Goldman's Pharmacy, Jerome is brought in as a player for Mort's team. To win the game, Horace attempts to strike Jerome out. Unfortunately for Horace, Jerome hits the ball so hard it accidentally flies into Horace's face and fractures his skull, killing him. During the funeral, Jerome explains to Peter that he feels awful about it; noting that Horace was a good bartender and a good guy. Jerome also wishes there was something he could do. Peter reassures Jerome that he did not mean to kill him. The guys say their goodbyes and head out to drink at The Drunken Clam only to find the bar is foreclosed. The guys are forced to drink at Peter's home, but Peter's wife Lois objects. Peter and the guys sneak into the Clam for a night of drinking. Next morning, they find the building is about to be demolished and Peter demands they stop as he claims ownership of the bar. During the stand-off, Joe finds himself in an uneasy position and bails out. Lois shows up and demands Peter come out. Joe is given the task to talk the guys out of it but when he enters, he rejoins their side and turns against the police chief. As they are all threatened with arrest, Jerome suddenly appears & reveals that he used his sports earnings from playing lacrosse (which is also his brother's name) to buy the Clam so he can keep it open to honor Horace's legacy, stating that he has to do it since he feels bad for what he did to Horace and it was his fault that this happened in the first place. The trio find the Drunken Clam modified by Jerome and then they are relegated to a space on the floor near a pile of garbage since there are three black guys in their usual booth.

In a sub plot, during Horace's funeral; Meg has to use the bathroom and stumbles into an embalming session. Her lack of squeamishness impresses the undertaker and he offers her a job. Soon, Chris shows up after being locked out of the house without a key and plays with the deceased bodies to Meg's annoyance. When she goes to dress the body of Mr. Dugan, she finds it is missing and discovers that Chris stole the body, using it to get into "R" rated movies until it fell apart in a swimming pool. Unable to find Dugan's body parts, Chris poses as Dugan during the funeral despite having itchy testicles. As they progress, they learn from Dugan's wife Helen that the deceased face is to be donated for a transplant to a woman who lost her face in a freak chimpanzee accident. Chris becomes furious at Meg for the loss of his own face, now unable to frown due to the transplant.

Reception
The episode received a 2.2 rating in the 18-49 demographic and was watched by a total of 4.79 million viewers. This made it the second most watched show on Fox's Animation Domination line-up that night, beating The Simpsons and Bob's Burgers but losing to American Dad!. The episode was met with mixed reviews from critics. Kevin McFarland of The A.V. Club gave the episode a B, saying "That’s a pretty standard way to appreciate anything that Family Guy does these days, tuning out the deliberately provocative jokes as though they're comments made by an older relative at Thanksgiving who gets a pass because they 'grew up in a different time.' Family Guy doesn't have that excuse, so when the material doesn't work because it trades in lazy stereotypes, it hurts the episode. Still, I laughed more this week at the remaining bits than I have in a few months." Carter Dotson of TV Fanatic gave the episode three out of five stars, saying "This was a rather pedestrian episode of the show, not a classic but not terrible. If your DVR didn't record it, you didn't miss much."

References

External links 
 
  The plot description was adapted from Save the Clam at Family Guy Wiki, which is available under a Creative Commons Attribution-Share Alike 3.0 license.

2013 American television episodes
Family Guy (season 11) episodes
Television episodes about funerals